Tryggve Larssen (October 3, 1887 – June 28, 1967) was a Norwegian actor.

Larssen debuted as an actor in Ludovica Levy's touring theatre in 1911, after which he was engaged with the National Theater in Bergen and the Norwegian Theater in Oslo. He was then engaged with the National Theater in Oslo from 1921 to 1961. As an actor specializing in comic roles, Larssen made a name for himself in annual Christmas performances, including as the first-ever Santa Claus in the play Reisen til Julestjernen (Journey to the Christmas Star) in 1924. He also played supporting roles in numerous plays by Ludvig Holberg, Henrik Ibsen, and William Shakespeare.

Larssen performed on stage until well into retirement age, and his last theater role was as Lavrans in the play Guds Gjøglere by Odd Eidem.

Larssen appeared in a number of Norwegian and Swedish films. He made his debut in the silent film era, and his last role in Norwegian film was in Storfolk og småfolk in 1951.

Filmography

 1927: Troll-elgen
 1928: Viddenes folk
 1929: Laila
 1930: Eskimo
 1935: Samhold må til
 1936: Norge for folket
 1936: Vi bygger landet
 1937: By og land hand i hand
 1938: Det drønner gjennom dalen
 1938: Eli Sjursdotter
 1938: Lenkene brytes
 1939: De vergeløse
 1939: Gryr i Norden
 1940: Frestelse (Swedish)
 1940: Mannen som alle ville myrde (Swedish)
 1940: Tante Pose
 1940: Tørres Snørtevold
 1941: Kjærlighet og vennskap
 1941: Den forsvundne pølsemakere
 1942: Det æ'kke te å tru
 1942: Trysil-Knut
 1943: Den nye lægen
 1943: Sangen til livet
 1944: Villmarkens lov
 1949: Aldri mer!
 1951: Storfolk og småfolk
 1953: No Man's Woman (Swedish)

References

External links

Tryggve Larssen at the Swedish Film Database
Tryggve Larssen at the Danish Film Institute

1887 births
1967 deaths
Norwegian male stage actors
Norwegian male film actors
20th-century Norwegian male actors
Actors from Bergen